Bakel is a town of approximately 15,000 inhabitants located in the eastern part of Senegal, West Africa. The town is located on the left bank of the Sénégal River,  from the Malian border and linked by canoe ferry to the village of Gouraye in Mauritania.

Bakel is one of the four eponymous departmental capitals in the region of Tambacounda, the other three being Tambacounda, Goudiry and Koumpentoum. Bakel is known for its French fort (Fort Bakel), which René Caillié visited in 1819. It was also the area where the Mauritanian crisis occurred, a dispute over grazing rights that led to a war between Senegal and Mauritania in 1989.  As a result of this conflict, many people around the area moved abroad or emigrated to Senegal.

People and Culture

The majority of the population belong to the Soninke-speaking ethnic group, a dialect of the larger Mande Languages language family. There is also a substantial Pulaar (Fula) speaking minority as well as a significant amount of Bambara and Wolof (or Oulof) speakers, while most people learn some French in school. A large permanent market serves the department's inhabitants along with a weekly "Lumo" (similar to a flea market). Most inhabitants are subsistence farmers and herders, while the people in town are employed in informal businesses that range from carpentry, masonry and transportation of goods to selling fruit and produce on the street.  Due to its location in the Sahel, the area is semi-arid with little vegetation outside of the rainy season. Various hills surround the town, which are known locally as "little mountains."

Bakel served as fodder for Bakel City Gang, a song by French rapper Booba whose father is from the town.

History 

The area that would become Bakel was first settled by a marabout named Abdoulaye Wane from Fouta Toro, along with his students, known as talibes. 

At the beginning of the 17th century, members of the Ndiaye family fleeing succession disputes in the Jolof Empire moved to the area, then part of the Kingdom of Galam, also called Gajaaga, (see: Royaume de Galam), eventually integrating into the local Soninke population.

The French began to penetrate the region in the 18th century, purchasing slaves from the Gajaaga monarchs to export from Saint Louis at the mouth of the river. 

In 1818, after the restoration of France's West Africa territories (which at the time consisted only in Saint-Louis and Gorée) in the 1815 Treaty of Paris, Auguste Jacques Nicolas Peureux de Mélay led a small flotilla up the Senegal . Blocked from going past Bakel by the seasonal drop in water level, they chose the spot to build a fort.  The fort was established to counter growing British penetration of the West African market, attracting trade in gum arabic, gold, leather, and ivory that might otherwise have made for Fattatenda in The Gambia. It also served to establish closer relations with the powerful, gold-rich Kingdom of Bundu further south. The fort became a base for promoting French influence, playing local leaders off of each other. Liberalization of trade after 1848 intensified the competition between native chiefs and groups vying for access to markets and imported goods. 

In the 1850's, the Bakel garrison was strengthened as Omar Saidou Tall's jihad gained strength in the region and presented over-matched local tribes with a way to undermine French power. In 1855, the fort was officially annexed, following pressure from Saint Louisian merchants. In 1858, upper Gajaaga, between Bakel and the Faleme river, was annexed to the French colony.

Bakel is also the site of a study of annual flow volumes of the Senegal river from 1904 to 1990 which showed a dramatic reduction in the river's volume especially in the past twenty years.

References

External links
Bakel Senegal

Populated places in Tambacounda Region
Communes of Senegal